Baron Marks of Broughton, of Sunningdale in the Royal County of Berkshire, is a title in the Peerage of the United Kingdom. It was created on 10 July 1961 for Simon Marks. He was chairman and managing director of the retail chain Marks & Spencer, a company co-founded by his father Michael Marks.  the title is held by his grandson, the third Baron, who succeeded his father in 1998.

Barons Marks of Broughton (1961)
Simon Marks, 1st Baron Marks of Broughton (1888–1964)
Michael Marks, 2nd Baron Marks of Broughton (1920–1998)
Simon Richard Marks, 3rd Baron Marks of Broughton (b. 1950)

The heir apparent and sole heir to the peerage is the present holder's son Hon. Michael Marks (b. 1989).

Coat of arms

References

Kidd, Charles, Williamson, David (editors). Debrett's Peerage and Baronetage (1990 edition). New York: St Martin's Press, 1990.

Baronies in the Peerage of the United Kingdom
Noble titles created in 1961